Ann Mary School is a private school on GMS Road near Balliwala Chowk in Dehradun, Uttarakhand. It is a senior secondary English medium, co-educational school affiliated to the Council for the Indian School Certificate Examinations.

The Founders 
Dr Deepak Arora and his wife Mrs Silvia founded the school in 1985. Ann and Mary were the name of the two grand mothers of Silvia, who contributed money towards building the school. Currently, Dr Deepak Arora is the Principal while Mrs Silvia is the Director of Education.

References

High schools and secondary schools in Uttarakhand
Private schools in Uttarakhand
Schools in Dehradun
Educational institutions established in 1985
1985 establishments in Uttar Pradesh